The North Carolina Republican Party (NCGOP) is the affiliate of the Republican Party in North Carolina. Michael Whatley has been the chair since 2019. It is currently the state's favored party, controlling half of North Carolina's U.S. House seats, both U.S. Senate seats, and a 3/5 or near supermajority control of both chambers of the state legislature, as well as a majority on the state supreme court.

History

Nineteenth century
Although Republicans first nominated a candidate for President of the United States, John C. Fremont, in 1856, the party was not established in North Carolina until 1867, after the American Civil War. With the help of the newly enfranchised freedmen, Republicans were briefly successful in state politics, dominating the convention that wrote the Constitution of North Carolina of 1868 and electing several governors. After Reconstruction, Democrats returned to power, often suppressing the black vote by violence and fraud. Republicans had success in the 1890s when they joined forces with the Populist party in an "electoral fusion." They gained enough seats in the legislature to control it in 1896, and elected Daniel L. Russell as governor in 1896.

Twentieth century
To prevent this kind of challenge, after Democrats regained control of the state legislature, in 1900 they adopted a constitutional suffrage amendment which required prepayment of a poll tax and an educational qualification (to be assessed by a registrar, which meant that it could be subjectively applied), and lengthened the residence period required before registration. A grandfather clause exempted from the poll tax those entitled to vote on January 1, 1867, which limited exemptions to white men. These barriers to voter registration caused a dramatic drop in the number of African-American voters in the state by 1904, although they constituted one-third of the population. An estimated 75,000 black male citizens lost the vote.

With North Carolina a one-party Democratic state of the Solid South following the disfranchisement of blacks, North Carolina Republicans struggled to survive as a party during the first half of the twentieth century. African Americans were virtually excluded from the political system in the state until the late 1960s. In 1928 Republicans carried the state's electoral votes for president (for candidate Herbert Hoover). White members of the Republican Party generally lived in the Piedmont near Charlotte and Winston-Salem, and the mountains in the western part of the state. In 1952 Charles R. Jonas was elected to Congress from the western part of the state as the first Republican since before the Great Depression. He was joined in 1962 by Jim Broyhill. From this base, and nearly winning the electoral votes for the state in the Presidential elections from 1952 to 1960, the party began to grow.

As in other southern states, in the late 20th century, white conservatives began to shift from the Democratic Party to the Republican one, especially after national Democratic leaders supported the Civil Rights Act of 1964 and the Voting Rights Act of 1965. White conservatives first voted for Republican presidential candidates. From 1968 through 2004, the majority of North Carolina voters supported Republicans in every presidential election, except 1976, when favorite son Democrat Jimmy Carter was elected from Georgia. When they re-entered the political system, African Americans shifted their alliance from the Republican to the Democratic Party, which had national leaders who had supported the civil rights effort and legislation enforcing their constitutional rights as citizens.

In 1972, Republicans became competitive in statewide elections for the first time since 1900: James Holshouser was elected Governor of the state, and Jesse Helms, a former Democrat who held office for a long time, was elected to the U.S. Senate. Jack Lee, who was elected state party chairperson in 1977, is widely credited with unifying the North Carolina Republican Party in this period.

The parties were generally competitive, with the state's voters split between them, through much of the rest of the 20th century.

Twenty-first century

The elections of 2010 led to Republican control of both houses of the North Carolina General Assembly for the first time since 1896 when it had gained success in a fusionist campaign with the Populist Party.

When the Republican-controlled legislature conducted redistricting in 2011, it established districts biased in favor of Republicans. As a result, although more voters chose Democratic congressional candidates in the state in 2012, Republicans won a majority of the seats. The district maps have been challenged in several lawsuits for racial gerrymandering, and the maps were struck down by a state court in 2019.

In 2012, Republicans retained control of the legislature and elected two Republicans, Pat McCrory and Dan Forest, as Governor and Lieutenant Governor, respectively. Most of the other Council of State offices (the Governor and Lieutenant Governor are Chairman and Vice Chairman, respectively) were won by Democratic candidates. (The other Republicans are Cherie K. Berry, Commissioner of Labor and Steve Troxler, Commissioner of Agriculture.)

In February 2021, the North Carolina Republican Party censured Senator Richard Burr after he voted to impeach Donald Trump for his role in inciting a pro-Trump mob to storm the U.S. Capitol. The next month, the party did not censure House Representative Madison Cawthorn amid numerous accusations of sexual harassment, as well as exposure of false and baseless claims that he had made about himself.

Party platform

North Carolina Republicans passed laws in 2016 to order the transgender people to use their bathrooms according to their original sex. On March 23, 2016, Governor McCrory signed the Public Facilities Privacy & Security Act (commonly known as House Bill 2 or HB2), which has been described as the most anti-LGBT legislation in the United States. One contentious element of the law eliminates and forbids cities to re-establish anti-discrimination protections for gay, transgender, and intersex people. The law also legislates that in government buildings, people may only use restrooms that correspond to the sex on their birth certificates, which has been criticized because it prevents transgender people who do not or cannot alter their birth certificates from using the restroom consistent with their gender identity.

Current elected officials
The party  controls six of the ten statewide Council of State offices and holds a majority in the North Carolina House of Representatives and a 3/5 supermajority in the North Carolina Senate. Republicans also hold both of the state's U.S. Senate seats and 7 of the state's 14 U.S. House seats.

Members of Congress

U.S. Senate
Republicans have controlled both of North Carolina's seats in the U.S. Senate since 2014:
Class II: Thom Tillis (Senior Senator)
Class III: Ted Budd (Junior Senator)

U.S. House of Representatives

Out of the 14 seats North Carolina is apportioned in the U.S. House of Representatives, 7 are held by Republicans:
NC-03: Greg Murphy
NC-05: Virginia Foxx
NC-07: David Rouzer
NC-08: Richard Hudson
NC-09: Dan Bishop
NC-10: Patrick McHenry
NC-11: Chuck Edwards

Statewide offices
Republicans control six of the ten elected statewide Council of State offices:
Lieutenant Governor: Mark Robinson
Commissioner of Agriculture: Steve Troxler
Commissioner of Insurance: Mike Causey 
Commissioner of Labor: Josh Dobson
Superintendent of Public Instruction: Catherine Truitt
Treasurer: Dale Folwell

North Carolina General Assembly
Senate President Pro Tempore: Phil Berger
Senate Majority Leader: Harry Brown
Speaker of the House: Tim Moore
Speaker Pro Tempore: Sarah Stevens
House Majority Leader: Mike Hager

See also
North Carolina Democratic Party
North Carolina Libertarian Party
North Carolina Green Party

References

External links

 NC Republican Senate Caucus Website
NC Federation of College Republicans
NC Federation of Republican Men
NC Federation of Republican Women
North Carolina Federation of Young Professional Republicans, formerly the NC Young Republicans
North Carolina Teenage Republicans
List of county parties
Oral History Interview with Jack Hawke (chair from 1987-1995) from Oral Histories of the American South

1867 establishments in North Carolina
Political parties established in 1867
Republican Party
North Carolina